Luca Maresca (born 28 December 1993) is an Italian karateka. He won the gold medal in the men's kumite 67 kg event at the 2019 European Games held in Minsk, Belarus. Four years earlier, he won the silver medal in the men's kumite 60 kg event at the 2015 European Games held in Baku, Azerbaijan.

Career 

In 2013, he represented Italy at the Mediterranean Games held in Mersin, Turkey and he won the gold medal in the men's kumite 60 kg event. He also competed at the 2018 Mediterranean Games held in Tarragona, Catalonia, Spain but did not win a medal this time; he finished in 5th place.

At the 2015 European Karate Championships held in Istanbul, Turkey, he won the gold medal in the men's kumite 60 kg event.

In 2018, he competed in the men's 67 kg event at the World Karate Championships held in Madrid, Spain. He won his first match against Rory Kavanagh of Ireland but lost his next match against Ali Elsawy of Egypt.

He won the silver medal in the men's 67 kg event at the 2022 Mediterranean Games held in Oran, Algeria. In the final, he lost against Dionysios Xenos of Greece.

Achievements

References

External links 

 

Living people
1993 births
Sportspeople from Naples
Italian male karateka
Competitors at the 2013 Mediterranean Games
Competitors at the 2018 Mediterranean Games
Competitors at the 2022 Mediterranean Games
Mediterranean Games medalists in karate
Mediterranean Games gold medalists for Italy
Mediterranean Games silver medalists for Italy
Karateka at the 2015 European Games
Karateka at the 2019 European Games
European Games medalists in karate
European Games gold medalists for Italy
European Games silver medalists for Italy
Competitors at the 2022 World Games
Karateka of Fiamme Oro
21st-century Italian people